Richmond station may refer to:

Australia
Richmond railway station, Melbourne, Victoria, Australia
Richmond railway station, Sydney, New South Wales, Australia
Richmond railway station, Queensland, Australia

Canada 
Grand Trunk station (Richmond), Quebec

New Zealand
Richmond railway station, New Zealand, in Richmond, New Zealand

United Kingdom
Richmond station (London), served by London Underground and National Rail
Richmond railway station (North Yorkshire) - no longer in service, but re-opened late 2007 as a community and commercial centre.

United States
Richmond station (California), served by Bay Area Rapid Transit and Amtrak
Richmond Main Street Station, a train station in Richmond, Virginia
Richmond Staples Mill Road station, another train station in Richmond, Virginia
Richmond station, a former Pennsylvania Railroad (later Amtrak) station in the Richmond Railroad Station Historic District in Richmond, Indiana

See also
Richmond (disambiguation)
Richmond Field Station, a research center in Richmond, California operated by the University of California, Berkeley
Richmond Hill station (disambiguation)